The 2020–21 season was Kaizer Chiefs' 25th season in the South African Premier Division, the highest division of South African football league system. After finishing in second place in the 2019–20 season, Kaizer Chiefs entered the 2020–21 CAF Champions League.

Squad

Season squad

Competitions

South African Premier Division

League table

Results summary

Results by round

Matches

MTN 8

Nedbank Cup

Champions League

Preliminary round

First round

Group stage

Group C

knockout stage

Quarter-finals

Semi-finals

Final

Squad information

Appearances and goals

Goalscorers
Includes all competitive matches. The list is sorted alphabetically by surname when total goals are equal.

Transfers

Released

Notes

References

Kaizer Chiefs F.C. seasons
Kaizer
Kaizer Chiefs